The 2012 version of the Syrian Cup is the 42nd edition to be played. It is the premier knockout tournament for football teams in Syria. Al-Ittihad is the holders.

The winner qualified for the 2013 AFC Cup.

Quarterfinals

|}

Semifinals

|}

Al-Wahda was declared as the cup winner after the other three semifinalists, Al-Ittihad, Al-Jazeera and Al-Shorta all withdrew.

References

External links
 Syrian Cup 2011/2012 at futbol24.com

2012
2012 domestic association football cups
Cup